In numerical analysis, the Peano kernel theorem is a general result on error bounds for a wide class of numerical approximations (such as numerical quadratures), defined in terms of linear functionals. It is attributed to Giuseppe Peano.

Statement 

Bounds 
Several bounds on the value of  follow from this result:

where ,  and are the taxicab, Euclidean and maximum norms respectively.

Application 
In practice, the main application of the Peano kernel theorem is to bound the error of an approximation that is exact for all .

 

See also 

 Divided differences

References 

Numerical analysis